Teragra trimaculata is a moth in the family Cossidae. It is found in Kenya.

References

Natural History Museum Lepidoptera generic names catalog

Endemic moths of Kenya
Metarbelinae
Moths described in 1929